Orchelimum is a genus of katydid with 21 known species.

Species
The following species are recognised in the genus Orchelimum:

 Subgenus Metarhoptrum Rehn & Hebard, 1915
 Orchelimum fraternum Rehn & Hebard, 1915
 Orchelimum superbum Rehn & Hebard, 1915
 Orchelimum unispina (Saussure & Pictet, 1898)
 Subgenus Orchelimum Serville, 1838
 Orchelimum agile (De Geer, 1773)
 Orchelimum bullatum Rehn & Hebard, 1915
 Orchelimum campestre Blatchley, 1893
 Orchelimum carinatum Walker, 1971
 Orchelimum concinnum Scudder, 1862
 Orchelimum delicatum Bruner, 1892
 Orchelimum erythrocephalum Davis, 1905
 Orchelimum fidicinium Rehn & Hebard, 1907
 Orchelimum gladiator Bruner, 1891
 Orchelimum laticauda (Redtenbacher, 1891)
 Orchelimum militare Rehn & Hebard, 1907
 Orchelimum minor Bruner, 1891
 Orchelimum nigripes Scudder, 1875
 Orchelimum pulchellum Davis, 1909
 Orchelimum silvaticum McNeill, 1891
 Orchelimum vulgare Harris, 1841
 Subgenus Stenorhoptrum Rehn & Hebard, 1915
 Orchelimum bradleyi Rehn & Hebard, 1915
 Orchelimum volantum McNeill, 1891
 †Orchelimum placidum Scudder, 1890

References

 
Tettigoniidae genera